Ashwini Bhat is an artist, based in Northern California. She is known for her sculptures.

Biography and work
Born in Puttur, Karnataka, India  Ashwini Bhat earned a master's degree in literature from Bangalore University. She studied classical dance (Bharata Natyam) for thirteen years and traveled internationally as a professional dancer in the Padmini Chettur Dance Company before beginning a career as a visual artist.

Bhat studied ceramics with Ray Meeker at Golden Bridge Pottery Pondicherry where she later worked as an artist-in-residence before building her studio and woodfiring kiln  near Auroville, Pondicherry, India.
Since 2015, she has lived in the USA.

Bhat lives in Northern California with poet, writer Forrest Gander.

Style and critical responses
Ashwini Bhat makes sculptural forms, some intimate scale and some larger than human scale.
 
She has collaborated with other artists and writers, including Sharbani Das Gupta, Debra Smith, and Forrest Gander. In addition to gallery shows in India, her work has been exhibited in the USA, in Australia and in China and featured in major art publications such as Lana Turner: A Journal of Poetry & Opinion (USA, The Logbook (Ireland), New Ceramics (Germany), Ceramic Art and Perception (Australia/USA), Marg Publications (India), Ceramics Ireland (Ireland), Ceramics Monthly (USA), Crafts Arts International (Australia), Info Ceramica (Spain), Art India (India), and Art New England (USA)

Stephen S. Bush, professor of religious studies and philosophy at Brown University, writes in his essay ‘Philosophical Perspectives on Emerson and Ashwini Bhat’
, “The terrestrial themes of her sculptures, in combination with their humanistic sensibility, emphasize the fundamental embeddedness of humans in their geologic environs and the continuities between humanity and nature. By grounding human concerns so thoroughly in the dirt—used here as a term of approbation—Bhat’s sculptures speak of thoroughly immanent value.”

Awards
 The Howard Foundation Fellowship for Sculpture (2013–14)
 Shortlisted for Emerging Artist Award (2013–14), ICMEA 2013, Fuping, China

Collections and exhibitions
 "50 Women: A Celebration of Women's Contributions to Ceramics" at the American Jazz Museum, Kansas City, USA, 2016
 “Standing Wave Exhibition,” The Studios Inc, National Council for Education in Ceramic Arts (NCECA) 2016 Conference, Kansas City, USA
 Indian Museum at the FLICAM (FuLe International Ceramic Art Museums), Fuping, China
 Sculpture Garden, Grand Hyatt, Chennai, India
 Collection of Dr Raj and Asha Kubba, New Delhi, India
 "Earth Took of Earth," solo show, Newport Art Museum, Newport, Rhode Island, USA
 "Terra Firma," a two-person show with Sharbani Das Gupta, AS220 Gallery, Providence, RI, USA
 United Art Fair, New Delhi, India
 "Allegory of Fire," Clayspace Co-op, Asheville, North Carolina, USA

References

External links
 Official Website

Living people
Year of birth missing (living people)
20th-century Indian women artists
21st-century Indian women artists
American ceramists
Indian ceramists
Indian women sculptors
Indian women ceramists
Artists from Karnataka
20th-century Indian sculptors
People from Dakshina Kannada district
Women artists from Karnataka
21st-century ceramists
American women ceramists
American women sculptors
Modern sculptors
Sculptors from California
21st-century American women